The New York State Forest Rangers (NYS Forest Rangers), is one of the law enforcement agencies of the New York State Department of Environmental Conservation, Division of Forest Protection. NYS Forest Rangers are New York State police officers, authorized to enforce New York State Laws, Rules and Regulations, and carry firearms.

Overview
Forest Rangers fulfill the role of police officers, wildland firefighters and wilderness first responders. Their duty is to protect the state's forests and the people who use them from danger. Forest Rangers patrol  of Department-administered public lands and easements by vehicle, boat, ATV, snowmobile, aircraft, bicycle, foot, skis or snowshoes. Each ranger is required to reside within the ranger district in which she/he is assigned but emergencies and special events will require them to work anywhere and at any time. Rangers are often asked to assist other agencies with complex emergency or law enforcement incidents that have occurred in or near a forested area.

The New York State Forest Ranger force is composed of 134 forest rangers, lieutenants, captains and directors stationed at locations across the state, with the greatest numbers located in the Adirondack and Catskill Parks.

Training
Every Forest Ranger must successfully complete a rigorous 26-week Basic Training School, currently held at the SUNY-ESF Ranger School in Wanakena, NY. Upon graduation, Rangers are assigned to a geographic area in one of nine regions of New York.

Each Ranger is trained and equipped for immediate response to outbreaks of wildfires, and also provides training to volunteers and local fire departments in wildland firefighting techniques.

Qualifications
New NYS Forest Rangers must: be a resident of New York, be at least 20 years old, possess a New York driver's license, be physically strong and active and able to pass a medical examination and physical ability test, and be able to pass a character background investigation and psychological evaluation.

Forest Rangers are represented by the Police Benevolent Association of New York State (PBA of New York State), a law enforcement labor union representing the interests of approximately 1,200 members of the New York State Agency Police Services Unit (APSU).

History
In May, 1885, Governor David B. Hill signed Chapter 283 into law, which authorized the appointment of the Fire Wardens. The Fire Wardens were overseen by the Forest Commission, which later became the Department of Environmental Conservation.

The title of Forest Ranger was created in chapter 444 of the laws of 1912.

Fallen officers
Since the establishment of the New York State Forest Rangers, one ranger has died while on duty. Forest Ranger Raymond L. Murray passed on October 9, 1970, due to an aircraft accident.

See also
List of law enforcement agencies in New York

References

External links
Official website
History of the New York State Forest Rangers

Environmental agencies in New York (state)